Dyrssen is a Swedish surname that may refer to
Gustaf Dyrssen (1891–1981), Swedish army officer and modern pentathlete
Helena Dyrssen (born 1959), Swedish jurist and politician
Lizinka Dyrssen (1866–1952), Swedish women's rights activist
Wilhelm Dyrssen (1858–1929), Swedish admiral

Swedish-language surnames